Gina Aitken (born November 17, 1993) is a Scottish curler from Edinburgh. She won a silver medal as skip of the Scottish women's team at the 2015 World Junior Curling Championships and has competed in the World Mixed Doubles Curling Championship five times.

Curling career 
In back-to-back years, 2014 and 2015, Aitken skipped her team to victory at the Scottish Junior Championships, with teammates Naomi Brown, Rowena Kerr, and Rachel Hannen. At the 2014 World Junior Curling Championships Aitken's team finished the round robin with a 3–6 record, missing the playoffs. Returning to the World Juniors in 2015, they found much more success. Aitken and Team Scotland finished the round robin in second place with a 6–3 record. In the page playoffs, Team Scotland defeated the number one seeded Canada in the 1 vs. 2 game and Sweden in the semifinals, thus setting up a rematch with Team Canada in the final. In the final, Canada, skipped by Kelsey Rocque, got their revenge, defeating Scotland 8–2. Earlier in the 2014–2015 season, Aitken and her juniors team also won bronze at the Scottish Women's Curling Championship, Aitken's best finish at that championship.

Aitken has also competed in the Scottish Mixed Curling Championship, playing third for Bruce Mouat in 2015 and 2016. At the 2016 Championship they won the bronze medal.

Aitken is also prolific in mixed doubles, where she has won the Scottish Mixed Doubles title five times. The first four championships, Aitken competed with her longtime teammate Bruce Mouat. Each Scottish title earned Aitken the right to represent Scotland at the World Mixed Doubles Championship, with her best finish being 4th at the 2016 Championship where they lost to the United States team of Joe Polo and Tabitha Peterson in the bronze medal match.

For the 2018–19 season, Aitken decided to focus on mixed doubles with her new teammate Scott Andrews. Andrews became injured shortly before the Scottish Mixed Doubles Championship, but Duncan Menzies filled in for Andrews and together they won Aitken her fifth Championship. Andrews was healed in time for the 2019 World Mixed Doubles Curling Championship, where they finished tied for 9th place, losing to Team Estonia in the first round of the playoffs.

Personal life 
Aitken started curling when she was only seven years old and comes from a curling family: her father David won the 1986 World Juniors, her mother Morna has competed at two World Senior Curling Championships, her sister Karina was the alternate for Aitken's silver medal winning 2015 World Juniors team, and her sister Tasha has also competed at World Juniors.

Aitken graduated with a degree in Film and French from Glasgow University. She works as an account executive at Optima Connect.

Teams

Women's

Mixed

Mixed doubles

References

External links
 

Scottish female curlers
Living people
1993 births
Curlers from Edinburgh
Sportspeople from Paisley, Renfrewshire
Scottish curling champions
Competitors at the 2017 Winter Universiade